Sheridan Lake may refer to:

 Sheridan Lake (South Dakota), reservoir in Pennington County, South Dakota
 Sheridan Lake (Hubbard County, Minnesota),  lake in Hubbard County, Minnesota
 Sheridan Lake, Colorado, Statutory Town in Kiowa County, Colorado